Nadeem Baig has acted in over 200 Pakistani Films from his debut film Chakori (1967); and in his hit films such as Diya Aur Toofan (1969), and Aina (1977) to modern superhits such as Main Hoon Shahid Afridi (2013). The following is a list of the films he has participated in as an actor or director.

Filmography

References

External links
, Filmography of Nadeem Baig on IMDb, Retrieved 15 August 2019

Male actor filmographies
Pakistani filmographies